Brian Joseph Leetch (born March 3, 1968) is an American former professional ice hockey defenseman who played 18 National Hockey League (NHL) seasons with the New York Rangers, Toronto Maple Leafs, and Boston Bruins. He has been called one of the top defensemen in NHL history. 

Leetch was inducted into the Hockey Hall of Fame in Toronto in 2009, his first year of eligibility. In 2017 Leetch was named one of the '100 Greatest NHL Players' in history. He will be inducted into the IIHF Hall of Fame in 2023.

Leetch accumulated many individual honors during his 18-year career. He was a two-time Norris Trophy winner as the NHL's best defenseman (1992, 1997) and was the first American-born winner of the Conn Smythe Trophy as playoff MVP for his performance during the Rangers' run to the 1994 Stanley Cup championship. Leetch is one of only five NHL defensemen to score 100 points in a season with his 102-point campaign in 1991–92. He won the Calder Trophy as the NHL Rookie of the Year in 1989 and his 23 goals that season remain an NHL record for rookie defensemen. Leetch's number 2 was retired by the Rangers on January 24, 2008. During the ceremony, longtime teammate Mark Messier referred to Leetch as the single "Greatest Ranger of All Time."

Biography

Early life
Leetch was born in Corpus Christi, Texas, but was raised in Cheshire, Connecticut, where his family moved when he was three months old. He first learned to play hockey at a local ice rink managed by his father, Jack. In high school, he starred in baseball and hockey, first at Cheshire High School, and then at Avon Old Farms. As a sophomore, Leetch's 90 mph fastball helped the Cheshire Rams baseball team to a state championship and, as a senior at Avon Old Farms, he set the school record for strikeouts in a game with 19. Hockey, however, was the sport in which he most excelled. As a sophomore at Cheshire, he scored 53 goals and 50 assists, earning All-state honors.

In two seasons with Avon Old Farms, Leetch scored 70 goals and 90 assists in 54 games. These numbers were especially remarkable for a defenseman. NHL scouts were starting to take notice and the New York Rangers chose Leetch as their first-round pick (9th overall) in 1986, making him the first player drafted that year who did not play major junior hockey. Following in the footsteps of his father Jack, Brian enrolled at Boston College in the fall of 1986, and, like his father, would become an All-America defenseman for the Eagles.

Playing career
After one season at Boston College, he played for the US Olympic team at the 1988 Games in Calgary, making his NHL debut, eight days later, with the New York Rangers on February 29, 1988, versus St. Louis. Leetch tallied his first NHL point in the game with an assist on Kelly Kisio's goal. He finished out the 1987-88 season with 14 points in 17 games. In his first full NHL season (1988-89), Leetch notched 71 points, including a rookie defenseman-record 23 goals, winning the Calder Memorial Trophy as well as being selected to the NHL All-Rookie Team.

As the Rangers slowly developed into a championship-caliber team, Leetch won increasing respect from fans for his quiet demeanor and entertaining, offensive-minded play. In 1992 he became the fifth defenseman in history, and the only American defenseman, to record 100 points in a season and was awarded the Norris Trophy. Leetch was the last NHL defenseman to record 100 points in a season. On March 21, 1993, Leetch suffered a broken ankle after slipping on black ice after stepping out of a cab. The injury caused Leetch to miss the rest of the season, prompting a Rangers slump that caused them to miss the playoffs. In 1994 he again matched his career-high of 23 goals in the regular season as the Rangers won the Presidents' Trophy. That year, the Rangers' 54-year championship drought ended with a seven-game Stanley Cup Finals victory over the Vancouver Canucks. Leetch became the first non-Canadian to be awarded the Conn Smythe Trophy, and remained the only American to do so until  Tim Thomas of the Boston Bruins in 2011. Leetch was the second player in NHL history (after Bobby Orr) to win the Calder Trophy, the Norris Trophy, and the Conn Smythe Trophy in his career. Only Cale Makar has matched this feat since.

Leetch was the captain of the 1996 championship team representing the United States of America in the World Cup of Hockey.

Following the Rangers' Cup win in 1994, Leetch remained a fan favorite and team leader, serving as Captain from 1997–2000 after the departure of Mark Messier to the Vancouver Canucks (he would return the captaincy to Messier upon Messier's return to the Rangers in 2000). 

In 1997, he again won the Norris Trophy and the Rangers made a surprise run to the Eastern Conference Finals, where they were defeated by the Philadelphia Flyers. The next years, however, were marked by disappointing team performances that saw the Rangers miss the playoffs every year.

After the Rangers

In 1998, Leetch was ranked 71st on [[List of 100 greatest hockey players by The Hockey News|The Hockey News''' list of the 100 Greatest Hockey Players]]. On June 30, 2003, as a pending free agent, his rights were traded to the Edmonton Oilers in exchange for Jussi  Markkanen and a fourth-round pick in the 2004 draft. The Oilers did not sign him, and he signed a two-year contract to return to the Rangers a month later. After the especially unsuccessful 2004 campaign, the Rangers traded most of their high-priced veterans;  Leetch was traded to the Toronto Maple Leafs just prior to the trade deadline for prospects Maxim Kondratiev, Jarkko Immonen, a first-round pick in the 2004 draft, which became Kris Chucko (pick was later traded to the Calgary Flames), and a second-round pick in 2005, which became Michael Sauer.

Leetch was set to play the 2004–05 season with the Maple Leafs, however, due to the 2004–05 lockout, the last year of his contract expired, and he became a free agent. Leetch signed a one-year, $4-million contract with the Boston Bruins before the 2005–06 season. Although the Bruins failed to make the postseason, Leetch scored his 1,000th career point as a member of the team.

Throughout the 2006–07 season, Leetch received contract offers from several NHL teams, but accepted none. On May 24, 2007, Leetch officially announced his retirement, bringing his 18-year NHL career to an end.

On September 18, 2007 Leetch was announced as one of the four recipients of the 2007 Lester Patrick Trophy.

On January 24, 2008, the New York Rangers retired Leetch's number 2 jersey, joining fellow 1994 Stanley Cup Champion teammates Mark Messier and Mike Richter, as well as Rod Gilbert and Eddie Giacomin in the rafters of Madison Square Garden. On that night, his friend, Derek Jeter of the New York Yankees congratulated Leetch for the honor of having his number retired with a video that ended with Jeter saying "So congratulations, from one number 2 to another." Leetch also had the honor of announcing during his ceremony that the New York Rangers would retire his friend and former teammate Adam Graves' number during the 2008–09 season, joining Leetch and the other greats above the Madison Square Gardens ice.

On October 10, 2008, both Leetch and Richter were among four were inducted into the United States Hockey Hall of Fame in Denver. Both of them also played for the silver medal-winning U.S. ice hockey team during the 2002 Winter Olympics.

On June 23, 2009, it was announced that Leetch would be inducted into the Hockey Hall of Fame. He was honored during the November 6–9 induction weekend alongside Steve Yzerman, Brett Hull and Luc Robitaille. The induction made it the third year in a row that a member of the Rangers' 1994 Stanley Cup team has been inducted into the Hockey Hall of Fame, following Messier in 2007 and Glenn Anderson in 2008, who was also inducted along with one of the on-ice officials when the Rangers won the Stanley Cup, Ray Scapinello.

In August 2015 Leetch became manager of player safety in the NHL's Department of Player Safety, leaving after one season.

Career statistics
Regular season and playoffs

International

Awards and achievements

Olympic silver medal (2002)
Olympic Tournament All-Star team (2002)
James Norris Memorial Trophy (Top NHL Defenseman) (1992, 1997)
NHL first team All-Star (1992, 1997)
NHL second team All-Star (1991, 1994, 1996)
Stanley Cup champion (1994)
First American-born Conn Smythe Trophy award winner (NHL Playoffs MVP) (1994)
Calder Memorial Trophy (Top NHL Rookie) (1989)
NHL All-Rookie Team (1989)
Hockey East Player of the Year (1987)
Hockey East Rookie of the Year (1987)
Hockey East Tournament MVP Award (1987)
Won bronze medal at 1986 World Junior Ice Hockey Championships.
All-Star Selection, Defense, 1987 IIHF World Junior Hockey Championships
NHL All-Star Game selection (1990, 1991, 1992, 1993, 1994, 1996, 1997, 1998, 2001, 2002, 2003).
Won gold medal at 1996 World Cup of Hockey – Was the captain of Team USA
While still playing, was named #71 on the 100 greatest NHL players, as compiled by The Hockey News (and the second-highest player born and trained in the United States, behind Frank Brimsek)
 Inducted into the Hockey Hall of Fame – 2009
 In the 2009 book 100 Ranger Greats'', the authors ranked Leetch the Top Ranger of All Time of the 901 New York Rangers who had played during the team's first 82 seasons.
IIHF Hall of Fame induction in 2023

New York Rangers awards
MVP: 1989, 1991, 1997, 1999, 2001, 2003
Players' Player Award: 2001, 2002, 2003, 2004
Frank Boucher Award: 2001
Crumb Bum Award: 1994
Steven McDonald Extra Effort Award: 1997
Good Guy Award: 2002
Ceil Saidel Memorial Award: 2002, 2003
#2 jersey retired by New York Rangers on February 24, 2008

Records

NHL records
Most goals by a rookie defenseman (23, 1988–89 season)

New York Rangers regular season records
Most assists, career: 741
Most goals by a defenseman, career: 240
Most points by a defenseman, career: 981
Most assists, single-season: 80 (1991–92)
Most points by a defenseman, single season: 102 (1991–92)
Most power-play goals by a defenseman, single-season: 17 (1993–94)

New York Rangers playoff records
Most assists, career: 61
Most points, career: 89
Most assists, one year: 23, 1993–94
Most points, one year: 34, 1993–94
Most goals by a defenseman, career: 28
Most goals by a defenseman, one year: 11, 1993–94

See also
 List of NHL players with 1000 points
 List of NHL players with 1000 games played

Notes

External links 

1968 births
Living people
American men's ice hockey defensemen
Boston Bruins players
Boston College Eagles men's ice hockey players
Calder Trophy winners
Conn Smythe Trophy winners
Hockey Hall of Fame inductees
Ice hockey people from Texas
Ice hockey players from Connecticut
Ice hockey players at the 1988 Winter Olympics
Ice hockey players at the 1998 Winter Olympics
Ice hockey players at the 2002 Winter Olympics
James Norris Memorial Trophy winners
Lester Patrick Trophy recipients
Medalists at the 2002 Winter Olympics
National Hockey League All-Stars
National Hockey League first-round draft picks
National Hockey League players with retired numbers
New York Rangers draft picks
New York Rangers personnel
New York Rangers players
Olympic silver medalists for the United States in ice hockey
People from Cheshire, Connecticut
Stanley Cup champions
Toronto Maple Leafs players
United States Hockey Hall of Fame inductees
Avon Old Farms alumni
Cheshire High School alumni
AHCA Division I men's ice hockey All-Americans